Pseudothymara staudingeri is a moth in the Himantopteridae family. It was described by Alois Friedrich Rogenhofer in 1888. It is found in Sierra Leone.

References

Moths described in 1888
Himantopteridae